Johann Sebastian Bach composed the church cantata  (Fortunate the person who upon his God), in Leipzig for the 23rd Sunday after Trinity and first performed it on 12 November 1724. The chorale cantata is based on the hymn by Johann Christoph Rube (1692).

History and words 

Bach composed the chorale cantata in his second year in Leipzig for the 23rd Sunday after Trinity. The prescribed readings for the Sunday were from the Epistle to the Philippians, "our conversation is in heaven", and from the Gospel of Matthew, the question about paying taxes, answered by Render unto Caesar.... The cantata is based on the hymn in five stanzas by Johann Christoph Rube  (1692). It is sung to the melody of Johann Hermann Schein "" (1628). An unknown poet retained the first and the last stanza as the cantata's outer movements. He derived the four inner movements as a sequence of alternating arias and recitatives from the inner stanzas. He based movement 2 on stanza 2, movements 4 and 5 on stanzas 3 and 4, and inserted movement 3, based on the gospel. According to Hans-Joachim Schulze in Die Welt der Bach-Kantaten (vol. 3), Andreas Stöbel, a former co-rector of the Thomasschule is a likely author of the chorale cantata texts, since he had the necessary theological knowledge, and Bach stopped the cantata sequence a few weeks after he died on 31 January 1725.

Bach first performed the cantata on 12 November 1724. He performed it again between 1732 and 1735, and between 1744 and 1747. For the second movement, the part for an obbligato violin is extant, but the part of a second obbligato instrument, possibly a second violin or an oboe d'amore, is missing.

Scoring and structure 

The cantata in six movements is intimately scored for four vocal soloists (soprano, alto, tenor and bass), a four-part choir, and a Baroque instrumental ensemble of two oboes d'amore, two violins, viola, and basso continuo.

 Chorale: 
 Aria (tenor): 
 Recitative (alto): 
 Aria (bass): 
 Recitative (soprano): 
 Chorale:

Music 

The opening chorus is a chorale fantasia. Strings and the two oboes d'amore play concertante music, to which the soprano sings the cantus firmus, and the lower voices interpret the text, speaking of "child-like trust of the true believer" in the first section, of "all the devils" in the second, "he nonetheless remains at peace" in the third. The key is E major, a rare, "rather extreme" key at Bach's time, as musicologist Julian Mincham notes: only about a third of Bach's chorale cantatas begins in a major key at all, and only two in E major, the other being Liebster Gott, wenn werd ich sterben? BWV 8, "a musing on death and bereavement and one of his most personal works".

In the tenor aria, movement 2, the motif of the first line "" (God is my friend) appears again and again in the voice and the instruments. The voice is "more convoluted" when the raging enemies and the "", those who ridicule or mock, are mentioned.

In movement 4, a bass aria with solo violin and the oboes d'amore in unison, Bach changes seamlessly from loud double-dotted music to "the most nonchalant texture imaginable" in 6/8 time to illustrate the text "But a helping hand suddenly appears", compared by John Eliot Gardiner to "God's outstretched hand as painted by Michelangelo in the Sistine Chapel".

Recordings 

 Bach Cantatas Vol. 5 – Sundays after Trinity II, Karl Richter, Münchener Bach-Chor, Münchener Bach-Orchester, Edith Mathis, Trudeliese Schmidt, Ernst Haefliger, Peter Schreier, Dietrich Fischer-Dieskau, Archiv Produktion 1978
 Die Bach Kantate Vol. 58, Helmuth Rilling, Gächinger Kantorei, Bach-Collegium Stuttgart, Inga Nielsen, Helen Watts, Adalbert Kraus, Philippe Huttenlocher, Hänssler 1980
 J.S. Bach: Das Kantatenwerk · Complete Cantatas · Les Cantates, Folge / Vol. 34 – BWV 136–139, Nikolaus Harnoncourt, Tölzer Knabenchor, Concentus Musicus Wien, soloist of the Tölzer Knabenchor, Paul Esswood, Kurt Equiluz, Robert Holl, Teldec 1982
 J.S. Bach: Cantatas (21st & 23rd Sunday after Trinity) , John Eliot Gardiner, Monteverdi Choir, English Baroque Soloists, Katharine Fuge, Derek Lee Ragin, Julian Podger, Gotthold Schwarz, Soli Deo Gloria 1998
 J.S. Bach: Complete Cantatas Vol. 11, Ton Koopman, Amsterdam Baroque Orchestra & Choir, Lisa Larsson, Annette Markert, Christoph Prégardien, Klaus Mertens, Antoine Marchand 1999
 Bach Edition Vol. 11 – Cantatas Vol. 5, Pieter Jan Leusink, Holland Boys Choir, Netherlands Bach Collegium, Marjon Strijk, Sytse Buwalda, Nico van der Meel, Bas Ramselaar, Brilliant Classics 1999
 J.S. Bach: Cantatas Vol. 28 – Cantatas from Leipzig 1724 – BWV 26, 62, 116, 139, Masaaki Suzuki, Bach Collegium Japan, Yukari Nonoshita, Robin Blaze, Makoto Sakurada, Peter Kooy, BIS 2004
 J.S. Bach: Kantate BWV 139 "Wohl dem, der sich auf seinen Gott", Rudolf Lutz, Schola Seconda Pratica, Susanne Frei, Antonia Frey, Johannes Kaleschke, Ekkehard Abele, Gallus Media 2008

Notes

References

Sources 

 
 Wohl dem, der sich auf seinen Gott BWV 139; BC A 159 / Chorale cantata (23rd Sunday after Trinity) Bach Digital
 Cantata BWV 139 Wohl dem, der sich auf seinen Gott: history, scoring, sources for text and music, translations to various languages, discography, discussion, Bach Cantatas Website
 BWV 139 – "Wohl dem, der sich auf seinen Gott": Cantata notes, Emmanuel Music
 BWV 139 Wohl dem, der sich auf seinen Gott: English translation, University of Vermont
 BWV 139 Wohl dem, der sich auf seinen Gott: text, scoring, University of Alberta 
 BWV 139.6 bach-chorales.com

Church cantatas by Johann Sebastian Bach
1724 compositions